Concord is a village in Dixon County, Nebraska, United States. It is part of the Sioux City, IA–NE–SD Metropolitan Statistical Area. The population was 166 at the 2010 census.

History
Concord was platted in 1883 soon after the Chicago, St. Paul, Minneapolis and Omaha Railway was extended to that point. Its name commemorates the Battle of Concord of the American Revolutionary War.

Geography
Concord is located at  (42.384224, -96.989072).

Climate

Demographics

2010 census
At the 2010 census there were 166 people, 62 households, and 47 families in the village. The racial makeup of the village was 95.8% White, 0.6% African American, 3.0% Native American, and 0.6% from two or more races. Hispanic or Latino of any race were 6.6%.

Of the 62 households 35.5% had children under the age of 18 living with them, 67.7% were married couples living together, 6.5% had a female householder with no husband present, 1.6% had a male householder with no wife present, and 24.2% were non-families. 21.0% of households were one person and 6.4% were one person aged 65 or older. The average household size was 2.68 and the average family size was 3.04.

The median age in the village was 40 years. 32.5% of residents were under the age of 18; 2.3% were between the ages of 18 and 24; 22.8% were from 25 to 44; 30.1% were from 45 to 64; and 12% were 65 or older. The gender makeup of the village was 50.0% male and 50.0% female.

2000 census
At the 2000 census there were 160 people, 65 households, and 43 families in the village. The racial makeup of the village was 98.75% White, and 1.25% from two or more races. Hispanic or Latino of any race were 4.38%.

Of the 65 households 36.9% had children under the age of 18 living with them, 58.5% were married couples living together, 7.7% had a female householder with no husband present, and 33.8% were non-families. 32.3% of households were one person and 13.8% were one person aged 65 or older. The average household size was 2.46 and the average family size was 3.16.

The age distribution was 29.4% under the age of 18, 8.8% from 18 to 24, 26.9% from 25 to 44, 18.8% from 45 to 64, and 16.3% 65 or older. The median age was 34 years. For every 100 females, there were 86.0 males. For every 100 females age 18 and over, there were 79.4 males.

The median household income was $36,875, and the median family income  was $39,286. Males had a median income of $26,250 versus $15,893 for females. The per capita income for the village was $13,783. About 4.5% of families and 10.8% of the population were below the poverty line, including 15.1% of those under the age of eighteen and 8.3% of those sixty five or over.

References

Villages in Dixon County, Nebraska
Villages in Nebraska
Sioux City metropolitan area